One Wish was a song performed by American jazz band Hiroshima that was released as the only single for the album Another Place.

Reception
Brian Chin of Billboard described the single as "an extremely laid-back jazz-funk [song]."

Remixes
The song was remixed by British composer Paul Hardcastle.

Chart performance

References

1986 singles
Jazz-funk songs
Smooth jazz songs
Synth-pop songs
1985 songs
Epic Records singles